El Gordo y la Flaca (literal translation: The Fat Man and the Skinny Woman) is an American Spanish-language entertainment pop culture news show.

History
El Gordo y La Flaca first aired on September 21, 1998, on Univision, hosted by Raúl De Molina ("El Gordo")  and Cuban model Lili Estefan ("La Flaca"), the niece of music mogul and producer Emilio Estefan, the husband of singer/songwriter Gloria Estefan.

The show combines interviews with actors, musicians, and other celebrities with reports on their comings and goings. The show appears weekdays on the Spanish-language television network Univision. It is filmed in the network's studios in Miami, Florida. at Newsport Building 8551 NW 30th Terrace, Doral,FL 33122

For many years, the show also featured an in-house coffee maker who appeared several times on live tv, Marta Martin Carrera-Ruiz, known to show viewers as "Martica la del Cafe".

Correspondents

The correspondents for the show are Gelena Solano from New York City, Oscar Petit, Clarissa Molina and Daniela Di Giacomo from Miami, Tanya Charry, Maria Hurtado and David Valadez from Los Angeles and Elizabeth Curiel from Mexico City.

See also
Raúl De Molina
Lili Estefan
Clarissa Molina
Jeinny Lizarazo
Mariela Cardona

References

External links
Official website at Univision

Entertainment news shows in the United States
Univision original programming
1998 American television series debuts
1990s American television news shows
2000s American television news shows
2010s American television news shows
2020s American television news shows